Bob Weaver (November 20, 1928 — June 17, 2006) was one of the United States's first TV weathermen.

Biography

Weaver was born in New York City. He moved to Florida to attend the University of Miami. Shortly after graduating, he was hired by WTVJ, becoming Miami's first TV weatherman; he would become a fixture at the station, holding the job for 54 years, from 1949 until his retirement in 2003. He was known as "Weaver the Weatherman."

Besides weather, Weaver also read commercials and station identifications, filled in on sports updates, and did other odd jobs at the station.

In 1988, Weaver helped found the Florida Youth Orchestra.

At the time of his death, Weaver was married to his second wife, Myra, with whom he had two sons, Jason and Shane. He had another son, Robert, from his first marriage as well as two daughters, Syndie and Lisa. He also had 3 grandchildren, Angie, Ryan and Danielle and 2 great-grandchildren, Logan and Calla.

Bob Weaver died of cancer in Miami, Florida, aged 77.

References

External links
 Miami Herald, "Bob Weaver: funny style, sunny spirit" June 19 2006

1928 births
2006 deaths
American television journalists
People from Miami
Weather presenters
Deaths from cancer in Florida
American male journalists
Journalists from New York City